Audrey Morris (November 12, 1928 – April 1, 2018) was an American singer and pianist who specialized in jazz ballads.

Biography
Morris was born on November 12, 1928 in Chicago. Morris grew up on the South Side of Chicago and had classical piano lessons in her childhood. Through the radio broadcasts of Your Hit Parade, she developed an interest in songs. In her school days she wrote lyrics. Her idols included Billie Holiday, Lee Wiley, Mildred Bailey, and Peggy Lee.

In 1950, she began performing in the Capitol Lounge and four years later began singing at Mister Kelly's. In 1955 she sang with Charlie Spivak and in 1956 with Claude Thornhill in the NBC television show Moonlight in Vermont. She recorded her first album in 1955 for the RCA sub-label "X" (Bistro Ballads, with Johnny Pate); the following year for Bethlehem Records (The Voice of Audrey Morris with arrangements by Marty Paich).

She was offered the opportunity to record an album of film theme music for Warner Brothers. In the following years, she continued to perform locally. She was the leader of a trio at London House, a jazz piano club. In the late 1960s, she limited her performances to her family. In 1981 she had another engagement at Palmer House.

In 1985, she released the album Afterthoughts (with Stu Genovese). In the field of jazz, she was involved between 1955 and 2001 in twelve recording sessions.

Death
Morris died at the age of 89 on April 1, 2018 at Presence Resurrection Medical Center in Norwood Park, Chicago.

Discography
 Bistro Ballads Sung by Audrey Morris ("X", 1955)
 The Voice of Audrey Morris (Bethlehem, 1956)
 Afterthoughts (Fancy Faire, 1985)
 Film Noir (Fancy Faire, 1989)

References

External links
 
 

1928 births
2018 deaths
Singers from Chicago
Jazz musicians from Illinois
20th-century American pianists
20th-century American singers
20th-century American women singers
21st-century American pianists
21st-century American singers
21st-century American women singers
American women jazz singers
American jazz pianists
American jazz singers
American women pianists
Women jazz pianists